The Catholic Church in the Dominican Republic is part of the worldwide Catholic Church, under the spiritual leadership of the Pope in Rome.

The Catholic Church is the world's largest Christian Church, and its largest religious grouping. There are an estimated 5 million Catholics in the Dominican Republic, (48% of the population), in 11 territorial dioceses and one military ordinariate, served by 800 priests.

Hierarchy
Within the Dominican Republic the hierarchy consists of:
Archbishopric
Bishopric

 Archdiocese of Santiago de los Caballeros
 Diocese of La Vega
 Diocese of Mao-Monte Cristi
 Diocese of Puerto Plata
 Diocese of San Francisco de Macorís
 Archdiocese of Santo Domingo
 Diocese of Baní
 Diocese of Barahona
 Diocese of Nuestra Señora de la Altagracia in Higüey
 Diocese of San Juan de la Maguana
 Diocese of San Pedro de Macorís
 Military Ordinariate of the Dominican Republic

Church in society
The Dominican Republic offers religious freedom, but the Catholic Church still enjoys certain favors, in particular due to a 1954 concordat with the Vatican. Under Rafael Trujillo's government, the power of the Catholic Church was limited. Although the Church remained apolitical during much of the Trujillo era, a 1960 pastoral letter of protest against mass arrests of government opponents seriously strained the relationship with the dictatorship.

Gallery

See also
 List of Central American and Caribbean Saints

References and notes

 Dominican Republic-International Religious Freedom Report 2005, U.S. Department of State. November 8, 2005. Retrieved July 13, 2006.

 
Dominican Republic
Dominican Republic culture